Sally Hardesty is a fictional character in The Texas Chainsaw Massacre franchise. She made her first appearance in The Texas Chain Saw Massacre (1974) as a young woman investigating her grandfather's grave after local grave robberies—crossing paths with Leatherface and his cannibalistic family in the process. In this film and later in The Next Generation (1995), she was portrayed by Marilyn Burns. Olwen Fouéré was cast in the sequel Texas Chainsaw Massacre (2022). The character, renamed Erin Hardesty and played by Jessica Biel, also appeared in a remake of the original film in 2003.

Filming was particularly challenging for Burns as she endured numerous injuries throughout the notoriously difficult shoot. In one such scene, Hansen cut her index finger with a razor due to the crew being unable to get theatrical blood to come out of the tube of a malfunctioned prop. Burns' stage clothes were so drenched with fake blood that they were solid by the last day of shooting.

The character has become a pop culture figure and is commonly referenced by film scholars when discussing the final girl theory; a trope of which Hardesty is credited for being the catalyst.

Although the character Sally Hardesty is the lone survivor of the four young protagonist friends in the original 1974 The Texas Chain Saw Massacre, her character dies in the 2022 reboot Texas Chainsaw Massacre from Leatherface chainsawing her in the stomach.

Appearances 
The character made her cinematic debut in The Texas Chain Saw Massacre on October 11, 1974. Created by Kim Henkel and Tobe Hooper, in this film, Sally (Marilyn Burns) is a free-spirited young woman traveling across Texas with her brother Franklin and friends to investigate her grandfather's grave after a series of local grave robberies. After visiting the abandoned Hardesty homestead, their friends are murdered by the cannibalistic Leatherface and his sadistic family. While searching for them, Leatherface appears and kills Franklin and Sally is pursued and captured. Bound at the family's dinner table, she breaks free and escapes. Although she does not physically appear in the following two sequels, Sally's aftermath from the first film receives mention in The Texas Chainsaw Massacre 2 (1986), which identifies her as Sally Hardesty-Enright. In the opening, the narrator states that Sally describes her traumatic encounter with Leatherface and his family as feeling like she had "broken out of a window in hell" and that she became catatonic after revealing her ordeal to the police. In the intro speech for Leatherface: The Texas Chainsaw Massacre III (1990), the narrator states that Sally died in a private health care facility in 1977. Burns briefly reprises the role in a non-speaking cameo appearance in Texas Chainsaw Massacre: The Next Generation (1995) as a patient on a gurney. Written by Henkel, he included Sally to convey "an emotional connection between the Sally character and the Jenny character, a kind of perverse passing of the torch". Sally returns in Texas Chainsaw Massacre (2022). Olwen Fouéré was recast as Sally following the passing of Burns in 2014. It is the first film since the original to feature Sally as a focal point, with her having a five-decade-long vendetta against Leatherface.

Development 
While studying at the University of Texas at Austin, Burns auditioned for the role of Sally when a casting call was held for The Texas Chain Saw Massacre (1974). Burns previously met Hooper when he was kicked off the set of Sidney Lumet's drama film Lovin' Molly (1974), in which Burns worked as a stand-in for Susan Sarandon and Blythe Danner. Burns did most of her own stunts during filming, such as jumping through the window during the ending and during the dinner scene, her finger was actually cut by a real knife with no fake blood being used. Originally, the 2003 remake was intended to be told in flashback format with an aged Sally recounting her experience with Leatherface to authorities. Burns was set to reprise her role. Ultimately, this version of the film was scrapped.

Popular culture
Hardesty was a featured character, alongside Leatherface, in Universal Orlando's 2012 Texas Chainsaw Massacre: The Saw is the Law Halloween Horror Nights amusement park attraction—appearing during a reenactment of the dinner table sequence from the 1974 film. American singer Tinashe homaged the character in the music video to her 333 (2021) single "Naturally" in a sequence featuring the singer covered in blood and laughing maniacally in the back of a pickup truck.

Reception 
In Making and Remaking Horror in the 1970s and 2000s: Why Don't They Do It Like They Used To?, David Roche contrasts Sally to Laurie Strode from the Halloween series stating: "All in all, Sally Hardesty and Laurie Strode have very little in common, apart from the fact that both characters survive the horror they have witnessed" and goes on to say that "Sally, the hippie, is very 'feminine' and not especially heroic: she undergoes intense suffering, attempts to sell her body, and seems to lose her mind. Sally is, in effect, the most resisting body. As such, the character of Sally simultaneously enables the Family to attempt to assert its masculinity in the face of the abject female and contributes to the discovery of the instability of sexist patriarchal values by bearing witness to the way the Family's mimicry of patriarchy reveals its constructiveness; these two functions coalesce in the shots of Sally's eyes. I would, thus, argue that the character of Sally by no means represents a feminist development, but her resilience does enable an anti-essentialist subtext to emerge to some extent". However, James Rose believes that Sally and Laurie have a lot of similarities, describing:

He goes on to state the difference between the two:

Editor Stefano Lo Verme compared Burns' performance as Sally to the performances of Sandra Peabody as Mari Collingwood in The Last House on the Left (1972) and Jamie Lee Curtis as Laurie Strode in Halloween (1978).

References

External links 
 

Film characters introduced in 1974
The Texas Chainsaw Massacre (franchise) characters
Fictional characters from Texas
Fictional characters with psychiatric disorders
Fictional sole survivors
Final girls